Virginia's 7th Senate district is one of 40 districts in the Senate of Virginia. The seat is currently held by Democrat Aaron Rouse, who was elected in a 2023 special election.

Geography
District 7 is located in the Hampton Roads metropolitan area in southeastern Virginia, including much of Virginia Beach and a small part of Norfolk.

The district is located entirely within Virginia's 2nd congressional district, and overlaps with the 21st, 82nd, 83rd, 85th, and 90th districts of the Virginia House of Delegates.

Recent election results

2023 special

2019

2015

2011

Federal and statewide results in District 7

Historical results
All election results below took place prior to 2011 redistricting, and thus were under different district lines.

2007

2003

2000 special

1999

1995

District officeholders since 1940

References

Virginia Senate districts
Norfolk, Virginia
Virginia Beach, Virginia